Catalina Sarsfield, also styled Catalina von Neuhoff and briefly as Catalina of Corsica, was queen of Corsica by marriage to Theodore of Corsica, who ruled the short-lived Kingdom of Corsica in 1736.

Catalina was the daughter of David Sarsfield, and niece of Dominick Sarsfield, 4th Viscount Sarsfield, both of whom had supported James II during the Williamite War in Ireland and had then left Ireland for France as part of the Flight of the Wild Geese. Part of the exiled Jacobite community, they served in Continental armies while hoping for the restoration of James II or his successors, which would lead to the recovery of their lost estates in County Limerick. David was killed fighting at the Battle of Villaviciosa in 1710. Catalina was the eldest of his six daughters, all of whom were born in Nantes.

In 1723, Catalina and her daughter followed her husband to Paris. She stayed in the court of Louise d’Orléans. Her daughter would later return to the Spanish court.

She is often mistakenly described as the daughter of the Jacobite hero Patrick Sarsfield and Honora Burke, who came from a distant branch of the Sarsfield family based in County Dublin. However, she was related to them by marriage.

References

Bibliography
 Gasper, Julia. Theodore Von Neuhoff, King of Corsica: The Man Behind the Legend. Rowman & Littlefield, 2013.

17th-century French people
18th-century French people
French people of Irish descent
Irish Jacobites
Nobility from Nantes
Queens consort
Catalina